Zhang Meng (born on 29 December 1988 in Zhengzhou), also known as Lemon Zhang, is a Chinese actress, singer and model. She graduated from Beijing Film Academy.

Career
Zhang first gained attention for her role as Biyao in the music video of the online video game Jade Dynasty in 2007.

In 2009, she portrayed Zhu'er in The Heaven Sword and Dragon Saber, based on Louis Cha's novel of the same name. Producer Zhang Jizhong praised her for being dedicated, and said she had great potential.

In 2010, Zhang was invited by Yu Zheng to star in historical drama The Firmament Of The Pleiades. The series earned high ratings in Japan and was nominated at the Seoul International Drama Awards, earning Zhang recognition.

In 2011, Zhang starred in the metropolitan drama My Daughter, portraying one of the three female protagonists alongside Tiffany Tang and Qi Wei. The series earned high ratings, and led to an increase in popularity for Zhang. 
The same year, she portrayed Princess Wansheng in Journey to the West.

In 2012, Zhang starred alongside Eddie Peng in the Taiwanese idol drama My Sassy Girl. She also starred in the wuxia drama The Magic Blade. The series was popular among young viewers, earning both high ratings and popular views. Zhang was also nominated for Most Popular Actress at the Shanghai Television Festival.

In 2013, Zhang played the role of Wang Yuyan in The Demi-Gods and Semi-Devils, adapted from Louis Cha's novel. The same year, she was cast in another television adaptation of Louis Cha's novel, The Deer and the Cauldron , portraying Shuang'er.

In 2014, Zhang guest-starred in xianxia drama Swords of Legends as Ma Tianyu's older sister, and received positive reviews for her performance.

Filmography

Film

Television series

Discography

Albums

Singles

References

1988 births
Living people
21st-century Chinese actresses
Actresses from Henan
Chinese film actresses
Chinese stage actresses
Chinese television actresses
People from Zhengzhou